SirVincent Rogers (born May 9, 1986) is a former gridiron football offensive lineman who played professionally for 12 years. He spent the bulk of his career with the Ottawa Redblacks of the Canadian Football League (CFL) where he won the 104th Grey Cup. He played college football at the University of Houston and attended Jasper High School in Jasper, Texas. He has also been a member of the Miami Dolphins, Hartford Colonials, Arizona Rattlers, Las Vegas Locomotives, Jacksonville Sharks, Toronto Argonauts, and Edmonton Elks.

Professional career

Miami Dolphins
Rogers was signed by the Miami Dolphins of the National Football League on April 30, 2009. He left the team on August 6, 2009.
He was re-signed by the Dolphins on February 16, 2010. He was released on March 9, 2010.

Hartford Colonials
Rogers was signed by the Hartford Colonials of the United Football League (UFL) in 2010 and released on September 3, 2010. He re-signed with the Hartford Colonials in 2011 but the team folded.

Arizona Rattlers
Rogers was signed by the Arizona Rattlers of the Arena Football League (AFL) in October 2011. The Rattlers went on to win ArenaBowl XXV.

Las Vegas Locomotives
Rogers played for the Las Vegas Locomotives of the UFL during the 2012 season.

Jacksonville Sharks
Rogers signed with the AFL's Jacksonville Sharks on January 11, 2013. He was placed on the Sharks Other League Exempt list in February 2013.

Toronto Argonauts
Rogers was signed by the Toronto Argonauts of the CFL on February 21, 2013. He spent two years with Toronto, playing and starting in 26 games with the team.

Ottawa Redblacks
Upon entering free agency, Rogers signed with the CFL's Ottawa Redblacks on February 11, 2015. Rogers played in 30 games for the Redblacks during his first two seasons in Ottawa. He was named a CFL All-Star in 2015 and was awarded the distinction of being the CFL's Most Outstanding Linemen for that season. Rogers won the 104th Grey Cup to conclude the 2016 season. Following the season he was re-signed by the Redblacks to a new two-year contract.

Edmonton Eskimos / Elks
Rogers signed with the Edmonton Eskimos for the 2019 season, but was injured before the season began and sat out all year. He did not play in 2020 due to the cancellation of the 2020 CFL season. He signed a one-year contract extension with the Edmonton Elks on February 4, 2021. He played in three games for the Elks in 2021 and was released on December 28, 2021.

Ottawa Redblacks
On January 28, 2022, Rogers signed a one-day contract with the Ottawa Redblacks and announced his retirement from professional football.

References

External links
Ottawa Redblacks bio 
Just Sports Stats
Toronto Argonauts profile
NFL Draft Scout

1986 births
Living people
African-American players of American football
African-American players of Canadian football
American football offensive linemen
Arizona Rattlers players
Canadian football offensive linemen
Edmonton Elks players
Houston Cougars football players
Las Vegas Locomotives players
Ottawa Redblacks players
People from Jasper, Texas
Players of American football from Texas
Toronto Argonauts players
21st-century African-American sportspeople
20th-century African-American people